The 2017 Anzac Test was a rugby league test match played between Australia and New Zealand at Canberra Stadium. It was the 18th and last Anzac Test played between the two nations since the first was played under the Super League banner in 1997. The match was played on 5 May 2017.

The Australian team was announced on 26 April, while the New Zealand team was announced on 30 April with the starters and 18th man named on 4 May.

The Junior Kangaroos beat the Junior Kiwis.

Squads

1 - Josh Papalii was originally selected to play but was withdrawn due to suspension. His original replacement, Shannon Boyd, also withdrew due to injury. He was replaced by Jake Trbojevic who was 18th Man.
2 - Aaron Woods was originally selected to play but withdrew due to injury. He was replaced by Andrew Fifita.
Jordan McLean, James Maloney and Justin O'Neill were a part of the Kangaroos squad but did not play in the match.
Elijah Taylor, David Fusitu'a and Brandon Smith were a part of the Kiwis squad but did not play in the match.

Match summary

Women's Test

A Women's rugby league match between the Australian Jillaroos and New Zealand Kiwi Ferns served as the curtain-raiser for the main game.

Australia initially named a squad with 25 players on April 26. This was then finalised to 20 in preparation for the Trans-Tasman Test.

New Zealand named their 18 player squad in preparation for the Trans-Tasman Test on April 26.

Women's squads

Match summary

See also

 Anzac Test

References

2017 in Australian rugby league
2017 in New Zealand rugby league
Anzac Test
Rugby league in the Australian Capital Territory
International rugby league competitions hosted by Australia
Sports competitions in Canberra
May 2017 sports events in Australia
2010s in Canberra